Giuseppe Alessandro Furietti (24 January 1685 – 14 January 1764) was a Roman Catholic cardinal, an antiquarian and philologist, and a collector of antiquities whose ambitious excavations at the site of Hadrian's Villa at Tivoli rewarded him with the Furietti Centaurs and other Roman sculpture.

Biography
Furietti was born at Bergamo, the son of Giovanni Marco Sonzogni Furietti, noble, of a local branch of the Sonzogni. He was educated at the Almo Collegio Borromeo, Pavia, then at the University of Pavia, where he received his doctorate in canon and civil law (utroque iure). In spite of his distinguished service to the Apostolic Camera, and  Furietti's dedication of a book on mosaics to him, the cardinal's hat was withheld by Pope Benedict XIV partly in pique for Furietti's refusal to part with the famous marble centaurs for the Museo Capitolino, which had opened in 1734. Furietti was eventually created cardinal priest, by Clement XIII in the consistory of 24 September 1759.

For a sum, Furietti obtained rights to excavate the section of Hadrian's Villa that belonged to Simplicio Bulgarini. As early as 1724, Conte Giuseppe Fede had been buying up parcels of land in the extensive villa, which had become divided up among a multitude of owners, forming the nucleus of one of the outstanding recently formed and non-papal collections of antiquities in Rome. After only a few days Furietti's crews found the famous statues of Centaurs signed by Aristeas and Papias, the "Furietti Centaurs", which quickly became two of the most celebrated sculptures in Rome, in part through the engravings of them made in 1739 and 1740 under Furietti's supervision. Charles de Brosses saw them displayed in Monsignor Furietti's apartments in the Palazzo Montecitorio in 1739-40, and Francesco de' Ficoroni described them in Furietti's collection in 1744. Furietti habitually employed Bartolomeo Cavaceppi as a restorer, hence some of the pieces that had passed through Cavaceppi's studio were illustrated from Furietti's former collection in Cavaceppi's self-promoting volume of plates, Raccolta d'antiche statue, busti, teste cognite ed altre sculpture antiche, 1768.

Among the mosaics he found at Hadrian's Villa is the celebrated one of four doves drinking, found in 1737; Furietti was convinced that it was the very work executed by Sosius/Sosos at Pergamum, mentioned by Pliny the Elder (Pliny's Natural History XXXVI,.25). It was the first plate in his book on mosaics, De Musivis (Rome, 1752), with six engraved plates, four of them folding, which became a classic on the subject. After Furietti's death, his heirs sold the two centaurs and the mosaic for 14,000 scudi, for the Museo Clementino.

Furietti was also a bibliophile.  He edited and published the works of two of his compatriots, Gasparino and Guiniforti Barziza, and the poems of Publio Fontana, prefacing the volumes with brief vite. His personal library he bequeathed to his native Bergamo, with the obligation that it be open to the citizens. It became the nucleus of the Biblioteca Civica Angelo Mai; there some of Furietti's correspondence is preserved.

His tomb is in the Roman church of the Bergamaschi, Santi Bartolomeo ed Alessandro dei Bergamaschi, also called Santa Maria della Pietà.

The early biography is G. Gallizioli, Memorie per servire alla storia della vita, degli studi e degli scritti del cardinale Giuseppe Alessandro Furietti, (Lucca) 1790.

Notes

Sources
Salvador Miranda, Cardinals of the Holy Roman Church: Giuseppe Alessandro Furietti
 Sonzogni, Ivano: Una Biblioteca per i bergamaschi di gran talento, il cardinale Furietti e la fondazione della Civica, in "Bergomum", Bollettino della Civica Biblioteca, n. 2, 1994, pp. 5–46
 Sonzogni, Ivano: ''Il carteggio Alessandro Furietti - Pierantonio Serassi. Momenti dell'erudizione bergamasca a metà Settecento, in "Bergomum", n.2, 1996, pp. 91–188.

1685 births
1764 deaths
Clergy from Bergamo
18th-century Italian cardinals
Italian scholars
Italian art collectors
Apostolic Camera
Writers from Bergamo